Anna Jaffé (1845 – 5 March 1942) was a Belgian-French art collector.

She was the daughter of the Brussels professor Gottlieb Gluge and grew up in academic circles. She met and married the Northern Irish merchant John Jaffé (1843-1934) in 1873 at the Brussels Town Hall.

After a short period in Belfast, the couple moved to Nice, where they lived in a villa on the Promenade des Anglais. The couple never had children but their cultural life has been documented by various sources. Anna was an avid art collector and was influenced in her purchases by Wilhelm von Bode. With his large fortune and Anna’s excellent taste for purchasing artworks, they were soon known for their collection of Old Masters paintings: works of Goya, Rembrandt and Constable decorated their house containing exquisite furniture and tapestries.

She and her husband were awarded the Legion d'Honneur by Nice mayor Jean Médecin on 3 May 1934.
Though her husband died soon after, Anna lived until 1942, and thus witnessed the Vichy Government crackdown on the Jews. Though she originally planned to leave her collection to various state institutions, as all the Jewish contacts at those institutions slowly disappeared she made the decision to change her will and leave everything to her nieces and nephews. Little did she know that her nieces and nephews lives were threatened at the time she died. Within days after her death, the house and its contents were seized and later auctioned by the state in complete disregard of her will. Though one nephew made numerous inquiries after the war, it was her grand-nephew Alain Monteagle who eventually managed to recuperate some of the major theft of belongings, having chosen to focus on the 200 well-documented paintings sold in the auction, mostly purchased by Anna in consultation with Bode.

Restituted works

References 

1845 births
1942 deaths
French art collectors
Jewish art collectors
Women art collectors
French people of German-Jewish descent
Stolen works of art
Recipients of the Legion of Honour